A hostage is a person or entity held by a captor.

Hostage or The Hostage may also refer to:

Film and television
 The Hostage (1917 film), a 1917 American silent drama film
 The Hostage (1956 film), a 1956 British crime film
 The Hostage (1967 film), a 1967 American low-budget film starring Don O'Kelly
 Hostage (1974 film), a 1974 Iranian film starring Reza Beyk Imanverdi and Nematollah Gorji
 Hostage (1983 film), a 1983 Australian film based on the true story of Christine Maresch
 Hostage (1988 film), a 1988 American made-for-TV film starring Carol Burnett
 Hostage (1992 film), a 1992 British-Argentinian film starring Sam Neill and James Fox
 Hostage (2005 film), a 2005 American thriller starring Bruce Willis
 Hostage (2014 film), a 2014 Czech-Slovak co-production directed by Juraj Nvota
 "The Hostage", a 1985 episode of the British sitcom Up the Elephant and Round the Castle
 "Hostage" (CSI: NY episode), a 2008 episode of American TV series CSI: NY

Literature
 Hostage (novel), a novel by Robert Crais, basis for the 2005 film
 The Hostage (play), a 1958 play by Brendan Behan
 The Hostage (1959 novel), a 1959 novel by Henry Farrell, basis for the 1967 film
 "The Hostage", a short story by C. S. Forester
 "The Hostage" (ballad), a 1798 ballad by Friedrich Schiller
 The Hostage (Dammaj novel), a 1984 novel by Zayd Mutee' Dammaj
 Hostage, a novel by Elie Wiesel

Music

Albums
 Hostage (Charles Bukowski album), 1994
 Hostage (Rez Band album), 1984

Songs
 "The Hostage" (song), a 1974 song by Donna Summer
 "Hostage" (song), a 2017 song by Billie Eilish
 "The Hostage", a song by Tom Paxton, recorded by Judy Collins on the album True Stories and Other Dreams
 "Hostage", by Mike Oldfield from Earth Moving
 "Hostage", by Queensrÿche from Operation: Mindcrime II
 "Hostage", by Hilary McRae from Through These Walls
 "Hostage", by Sia Furler from 1000 Forms of Fear

People
 Hostage (electronic musician) (born 1977), Scottish electronic music producer
 Gilmary M. Hostage III (born 1955), United States Air Force general

See also

 Hostages (disambiguation)